Pewaukee Lake is a lake located in Waukesha County, Wisconsin, United States.

The lake is known for its inland sailing races. National sailing events take place annually and are often hosted by the Pewaukee Yacht Club located on the southern shore of the lake.

The lake's fish include bluegill, largemouth bass, smallmouth bass, muskellunge ("muskie"), northern pike, tiger muskellunge ("tiger muskie"), walleye, yellow perch and non-native carp.

Pewaukee Lake experienced high waters and flooding during the spring and summer of 2008. The floods caused millions of dollars in damages to the surrounding area.

History

Pewaukee Lake has long been a summertime destination for Milwaukee residents. In winter months, ice was often removed from the lake for residents of Milwaukee in the 1800s.

External links
Bathymetric map of Pewaukee Lake
Pewaukee Lake at Lake-Link

Lakes of Wisconsin
Lakes of Waukesha County, Wisconsin
Tourist attractions in Waukesha County, Wisconsin